Dombóvár is a town in Tolna County, Hungary.

Twin towns – sister cities

Dombóvár is twinned with:
 Kernen im Remstal, Germany
 Ogulin, Croatia
 Vir, Croatia
 Höganäs, Sweden

Notable people
 Ján Golian (1906-1945), Slovak Brigadier General and one of the most important figures of the Slovak National Uprising
 Zoltán Tildy, Jr. (1917-1994), photographer

Gallery

References

External links

  in Hungarian
 Street map 

Populated places in Tolna County
Hungarian German communities